Computing, subtitled Archives for Scientific Computing, is a scientific journal published by Springer, which publishes research in computer science and numerical computation. Its ISSN is 0010-485X for the print version and 1436-5057 for the electronic version. , the editors of the journal are Hermann Brunner, Rainer Burkard, Craig Douglas, Wolfgang Hackbusch and Dietmar Saupe. The first volume was published in 1966.

References 

Mathematics journals
Computer science journals
Springer Science+Business Media academic journals
Publications established in 1966